Arthur Fitzsimons (16 December 1929 – 9 May 2018) was an Irish professional footballer player and manager. An inside forward, he notably made over 200 appearances for Middlesbrough.

Career
Originally from Penrose Street, in the shadow of Shelbourne Park, the stadium named after Shelbourne F.C. ("the Shels", or "the Reds"), their then home ground, Arthur signed with 'the Shels' from the famous schoolboy nursery club, Johnville F.C.

Already well known for his talent at junior level, the scouts were anxious to see how he would perform at this higher level. So well did he perform with 'the Reds', that it is almost forgotten he played for them only one season, 194849, before being transferred over the water. But it was no coincidence that that season was one of the best in the club's history, being in contention until the last match in all four available competitions, finally winning two of them, and finishing runner-up in the others. At the end of the season, he was part of a two-player deal when transferred (with Peter Desmond) to Middlesbrough F.C. in the English First Division. He went on to play in 223 games, scoring 49 goals. His teammates included Brian Clough and Wilf Mannion.

In the 1960s, his coaching career took him to Libya, where he spent five and a half years in Tripoli until Colonel Gaddafi came to power, when he was advised to leave.

In August 1967, he signed for Drogheda as player-coach, a position he shared with Theo Dunne. In April 1969, his contract was terminated.

In June 1969, he was appointed manager of Shamrock Rovers, taking over from Liam Tuohy. Despite beating FC Schalke 04 in a 1969-70 European Cup Winners' Cup first leg tie, he was fired two months later.
      
He also played 26 times for the Republic of Ireland national team, scoring 7 goals.

Later life and death
In 2009, Fitzsimons was inducted into the Football Association of Ireland Hall of Fame.

He died aged 88 on 9 May 2018.

References

External links
 

1929 births
2018 deaths
Association footballers from Dublin (city)
Republic of Ireland association footballers
Republic of Ireland international footballers
Ireland (FAI) international footballers
Association football forwards
Shelbourne F.C. players
Middlesbrough F.C. players
Lincoln City F.C. players
Mansfield Town F.C. players
English Football League players
League of Ireland managers
Drogheda United F.C. managers
Shamrock Rovers F.C. managers
League of Ireland XI managers
Dublin University A.F.C. coaches
Republic of Ireland football managers
Association football coaches
Republic of Ireland expatriate football managers
Expatriate football managers in Libya
Expatriate sportspeople in Libya